Michael Zeno Diemer (8 February 1867, Munich - 28 February 1939, Oberammergau) was a German painter. Now known primarily for his marine paintings and postcard designs, he was initially famous for his panoramic paintings of battles.

Life and work 
In 1884, he enrolled at the Academy of Fine Arts, Munich, where he studied with Gabriel Hackl and Alexander von Liezen-Mayer.

His fame initially derived from his impressive battle paintings. In 1894, over the course of six months, he worked in Innsbruck, where he created a 1000 square meter (10,800 square feet) panoramic painting depicting the Battles of Bergisel (1809), in which forces led by Andreas Hofer defeated the armies of Napoleon and the Kingdom of Bavaria.

Another panorama from 1896 depicted the Battle of Bazeilles from the Franco-Prussian War. It was displayed at a specially constructed building in Mannheim and is now lost. He  created several works for the Deutsches Museum in Munich; including a Roman aqueduct for the hydraulic engineering display, a Medieval herb garden and the flight of a zeppelin (1909). In Stuttgart, for the "Ketterer", a restaurant at a brewery, he produced a series of fourteen large paintings on the history of Swabian emigration.

As a watercolorist, he produced numerous landscape paintings and maritime scenes, poster designs, and postcard motifs. He also worked as a musician and a composer.

His wife, Hermine, was the eldest daughter of the actress and writer, Wilhelmine von Hillern. His son, Franz-Zeno Diemer, was a pioneering test pilot and flight engineer.

References

Further reading 
 Franz Schiermeier: Panorama München, Illusion und Wirklichkeit, München als Zentrum der Panoramenherstellung. Franz Schiermeier Verlag, Munich 2009,

External links 

 More works by Diemer @ ArtNet
 The Battles of Bergisel at the Riesenrundgemälde
 
 Listing @ the Bavarian State Library

1867 births
1939 deaths
19th-century German painters
19th-century German male artists
Military art
Panoramas
German marine artists
Academy of Fine Arts, Munich alumni
20th-century German painters
20th-century German male artists